John Anderson Scudder (March 22, 1759 – November 6, 1836) was a U.S. Representative from New Jersey.

Born in Freehold, New Jersey, Scudder completed preparatory studies, and graduated from Princeton College in 1775. He studied medicine and commenced practice in Monmouth County, New Jersey. During the Revolutionary War, Scudder served as a surgeon's mate in the First Regiment of Monmouth County, in 1777. He was the Secretary of the New Jersey Medical Society in 1788 and 1789.

He served as a member of the New Jersey General Assembly representing Monmouth County from 1801 through 1807, and as a member of the New Jersey Legislative Council in 1809.

Scudder was elected as a Democratic-Republican to the Eleventh Congress to fill the vacancy caused by the death of James Cox and served from October 31, 1810, to March 3, 1811. He was not a candidate for renomination to the Twelfth Congress.

Scudder resumed the practice of medicine. He moved to Kentucky after 1810 and to Daviess County, Indiana, in 1819. He died in Washington, Indiana on November 6, 1836, and was interred in the Old City Cemetery there.

References

External links
John Anderson Scudder entry at The Political Graveyard

1759 births
1836 deaths
Members of the New Jersey General Assembly
Members of the New Jersey Legislative Council
People from Freehold Township, New Jersey
Politicians from Monmouth County, New Jersey
Princeton University alumni
Democratic-Republican Party members of the United States House of Representatives from New Jersey